Labaro is a suburb of Rome.

Labaro may also refer to:

 Cantabrian labarum or Lábaru, a modern interpretation of the ancient military standard (flag)
 Lábaro, a Druid character in the 1980 film  The Cantabrians
 El Lábaro, periodical published by Dolores Gortázar Serantes  (1872–1936)

See also
Lauburu, or Basque cross
Laparotomy, or Labarotomy